

Events

Pre-1600
 461 – Roman Emperor Majorian is beheaded near the river Iria in north-west Italy following his arrest and deposition by the magister militum Ricimer.
 626 – The Avar and Slav armies leave the siege of Constantinople.
 768 – Pope Stephen III is elected to office, and quickly seeks Frankish protection against the Lombard threat, since the Byzantine Empire is no longer able to help.
 936 – Coronation of King Otto I of Germany.
1461 – The Ming dynasty Chinese military general Cao Qin stages a coup against the Tianshun Emperor.
1479 – Battle of Guinegate: French troops of King Louis XI were defeated by the Burgundians led by Archduke Maximilian of Habsburg.

1601–1900
1679 – The brigantine Le Griffon, commissioned by René-Robert Cavelier, Sieur de La Salle, is towed to the south-eastern end of the Niagara River, to become the first ship to sail the upper Great Lakes of North America.
1714 – The Battle of Gangut: The first important victory of the Russian Navy.
1743 – The Treaty of Åbo ended the 1741–1743 Russo-Swedish War.
1782 – George Washington orders the creation of the Badge of Military Merit to honor soldiers wounded in battle. It is later renamed to the more poetic Purple Heart.
1786 – The first federal Indian Reservation is created by the United States.
1789 – The United States Department of War is established.
1791 – American troops destroy the Miami town of Kenapacomaqua near the site of present-day Logansport, Indiana in the Northwest Indian War.
1794 – U.S. President George Washington invokes the Militia Acts of 1792 to suppress the Whiskey Rebellion in western Pennsylvania.
1819 – Simón Bolívar triumphs over Spain in the Battle of Boyacá.
1858 – The first Australian rules football match is played between Melbourne Grammar and Scotch College.
1890 – Anna Månsdotter, found guilty of the 1889 Yngsjö murder, became the last woman to be executed in Sweden.

1901–present
1909 – Alice Huyler Ramsey and three friends become the first women to complete a transcontinental auto trip, taking 59 days to travel from New York, New York to San Francisco, California.
1927 – The Peace Bridge opens between Fort Erie, Ontario and Buffalo, New York.
1930 – The last confirmed lynching of black people in the Northern United States occurs in Marion, Indiana; two men, Thomas Shipp and Abram Smith, are killed.
1933 – The Kingdom of Iraq slaughters over 3,000 Assyrians in the village of Simele. This date is recognized as Martyrs Day or National Day of Mourning by the Assyrian community in memory of the Simele massacre. 
1942 – World War II: The Battle of Guadalcanal begins as the United States Marines initiate the first American offensive of the war with landings on Guadalcanal and Tulagi in the Solomon Islands.
1944 – IBM dedicates the first program-controlled calculator, the Automatic Sequence Controlled Calculator (known best as the Harvard Mark I).
1946 – The government of the Soviet Union presented a note to its Turkish counterparts which refuted the latter's sovereignty over the Turkish Straits, thus beginning the Turkish Straits crisis.
1947 – Thor Heyerdahl's balsa wood raft, the Kon-Tiki, smashes into the reef at Raroia in the Tuamotu Islands after a 101-day,  journey across the Pacific Ocean in an attempt to prove that pre-historic peoples could have traveled from South America.
  1947   – The Bombay Municipal Corporation formally takes over the Bombay Electric Supply and Transport (BEST).
1959 – Explorer program: Explorer 6 launches from the Atlantic Missile Range in Cape Canaveral, Florida.
1960 – Ivory Coast becomes independent from France.
1962 – Canadian-born American pharmacologist Frances Oldham Kelsey is awarded the U.S. President's Award for Distinguished Federal Civilian Service for her refusal to authorize thalidomide.
1964 – Vietnam War: The U.S. Congress passes the Gulf of Tonkin Resolution giving U.S. President Lyndon B. Johnson broad war powers to deal with North Vietnamese attacks on American forces.
1969 – Richard Nixon appoints Luis R. Bruce, a Mohawk-Oglala Sioux and co-founder of the National Congress of American Indians, as the new commissioner of the Bureau of Indian Affairs.
1970 – California judge Harold Haley is taken hostage in his courtroom and killed during an effort to free George Jackson from police custody.
1974 – Philippe Petit performs a high wire act between the twin towers of the World Trade Center  in the air.
1976 – Viking program: Viking 2 enters orbit around Mars.
1978 – U.S. President Jimmy Carter declares a federal emergency at Love Canal due to toxic waste that had been disposed of negligently.
1981 – The Washington Star ceases all operations after 128 years of publication.
1985 – Takao Doi, Mamoru Mohri and Chiaki Mukai are chosen to be Japan's first astronauts.
1987 – Cold War: Lynne Cox becomes the first person to swim from the United States to the Soviet Union, crossing the Bering Strait from Little Diomede Island in Alaska to Big Diomede in the Soviet Union.
1989 – U.S. Congressman Mickey Leland (D-TX) and 15 others die in a plane crash in Ethiopia.
1990 – First American soldiers arrive in Saudi Arabia as part of the Gulf War.
1993 – Ada Deer, a Menominee activist, is sworn in as the head of the Bureau of Indian Affairs.
1995 – The Chilean government declares state of emergency in the southern half of the country in response to an event of intense, cold, wind, rain and snowfall known as the White Earthquake.  
1997 – Space Shuttle Program: The Space Shuttle Discovery launches on STS-85 from the Kennedy Space Center in Cape Canaveral, Florida.
  1997   – Fine Air Flight 101 crashes after takeoff from Miami International Airport, killing five people.
1998 – Bombings at United States embassies in Dar es Salaam, Tanzania and Nairobi, Kenya kill approximately 212 people.
1999 – The Chechnya-based Islamic International Brigade invades neighboring Dagestan.
2007 – At AT&T Park, Barry Bonds hits his 756th career home run to surpass Hank Aaron's 33-year-old record.
2008 – The start of the Russo-Georgian War over the territory of South Ossetia.
2020 – Air India Express Flight 1344 overshoots the runway at Calicut International Airport in the Malappuram district of Kerala, India, and crashes, killing 21 of the 190 people on board.

Births

Pre-1600
 317 – Constantius II, Roman emperor (d. 361)
1282 – Elizabeth of Rhuddlan (d. 1316)
1533 – Alonso de Ercilla, Spanish soldier and poet (d. 1595)
1560 – Elizabeth Báthory, Hungarian aristocrat and purported serial killer (d. 1614)
1571 – Thomas Lupo, English viol player and composer (d. 1627)
1574 – Robert Dudley, English explorer and cartographer (d. 1649)
1598 – Georg Stiernhielm, Swedish poet and linguist (d. 1672)

1601–1900
1613 – William Frederick, Prince of Nassau-Dietz, Dutch stadtholder (d. 1664)
1702 – Muhammad Shah, Mughal emperor of India (d. 1748)
1726 – James Bowdoin, American banker and politician, 2nd Governor of Massachusetts (d. 1790)
1742 – Nathanael Greene, American general (d. 1786)
1751 – Wilhelmina of Prussia, Princess of Orange (d. 1820)
  1779   – Carl Ritter, German geographer and academic (d. 1859)
1826 – August Ahlqvist, Finnish professor, poet, scholar of the Finno-Ugric languages, author, and literary critic (d. 1889)
1844 – Auguste Michel-Lévy, French geologist and author (d. 1911)
1860 – Alan Leo, English astrologer and author (d. 1917)
1862 – Henri Le Sidaner, French painter (d. 1939)
  1862   – Victoria of Baden (d. 1931)
1867 – Emil Nolde, Danish-German painter and illustrator (d. 1956)
1868 – Ladislaus Bortkiewicz, Russian-German economist and statistician (d. 1931)
  1868   – Huntley Wright, English actor (d. 1941)
1869 – Mary Frances Winston,  American mathematician (d. 1959)
1876 – Mata Hari, Dutch dancer and spy (d. 1917)
1879 – Johannes Kotze, South African cricketer (d. 1931)
1884 – Billie Burke, American actress and singer (d. 1970)
  1884   – Nikolai Triik, Estonian painter and illustrator (d. 1940) 
1887 – Anna Elisabet Weirauch, German author and playwright (d. 1970)
1890 – Elizabeth Gurley Flynn, American author and activist (d. 1964)

1901–present
1901 – Ann Harding, American actress and singer (d. 1981)
1903 – Louis Leakey, Kenyan-English palaeontologist and archaeologist (d. 1972)
1904 – Ralph Bunche, American political scientist, academic, and diplomat, Nobel Prize laureate (d. 1971)
1907 – Albert Kotin, Belarusian-American soldier and painter (d. 1980)
1910 – Freddie Slack, American pianist and bandleader (d. 1965)
1911 – István Bibó, Hungarian lawyer and politician (d. 1979)
  1911   – Nicholas Ray, American director and screenwriter (d. 1979)
1913 – George Van Eps, American guitarist (d. 1998)
1916 – Kermit Love,  American actor, puppeteer, and costume designer (d. 2008)
1918 – C. Buddingh', Dutch poet and translator (d. 1985)
  1918   – Gordon Zahn, American sociologist and author (d. 2007)
1921 – Manitas de Plata, French guitarist (d. 2014)
  1921   – Karel Husa, Czech-American composer and conductor (d. 2016)
1924 – Kenneth Kendall, Indian-English journalist and actor (d. 2012)
1925 – Felice Bryant, American songwriter (d. 2003)
1926 – Stan Freberg, American puppeteer, voice actor, and singer (d. 2015)
1927 – Rocky Bridges, American baseball player and coach (d. 2015)
  1927   – Edwin Edwards, American soldier, lawyer, and politician, 50th Governor of Louisiana (d. 2021)   
  1927   – Art Houtteman, American baseball player and journalist (d. 2003)
1928 – Betsy Byars, American author and academic (d. 2020)
  1928   – Owen Luder, English architect, designed Tricorn Centre and Trinity Square (d. 2021)
  1928   – James Randi, Canadian-American stage magician and author (d. 2020)
1929 – Don Larsen, American baseball player (d. 2020)
1930 – Togrul Narimanbekov, Azerbaijani-French painter and academic (d. 2013)
  1930   – Veljo Tormis, Estonian composer and educator (d. 2017)
1931 – Jack Good, British television producer (d. 2017)
  1931   – Charles E. Rice, American scholar and author (d. 2015)
1932 – Abebe Bikila, Ethiopian runner (d. 1973)
  1932   – Edward Hardwicke, English actor (d. 2011)
  1932   – Rien Poortvliet, Dutch painter and illustrator (d. 1995)
  1932   – Maurice Rabb, Jr., American ophthalmologist and academic (d. 2005)
1933 – Eddie Firmani, South African footballer and manager
  1933   – Elinor Ostrom, American economist and academic, Nobel Prize laureate (d. 2012)
  1933   – Jerry Pournelle, American journalist and author (d. 2017)
  1933   – Alberto Romulo, Filipino politician and diplomat
1934 – Sándor Simó, Hungarian director, producer, and screenwriter (d. 2001)
1935 – Lee Corso, American college football coach and broadcaster
1935 – Rahsaan Roland Kirk, American saxophonist and composer (d. 1977)
1937 – Zoltán Berczik, Hungarian table tennis player and coach (d. 2011)
  1937   – Don Wilson, English cricketer and coach (d. 2012)
1940 – Jean-Luc Dehaene, French-Belgian lawyer and politician, 63rd Prime Minister of Belgium (d. 2014)
  1940   – Uwe Nettelbeck, German record producer, journalist and film critic (d. 2007)
1941 – Matthew Evans, Baron Evans of Temple Guiting, English publisher and politician (d. 2016)
1942 – Garrison Keillor, American humorist, novelist, short story writer, and radio host
  1942   – Carlos Monzon, Argentinian boxer and actor (d. 1995)
  1942   – Caetano Veloso, Brazilian singer-songwriter, writer and producer
  1942   – Richard Sykes, English biochemist and academic
  1942   – B. J. Thomas, American singer (d. 2021) 
1943 – Mohammed Badie, Egyptian religious leader
  1943   – Lana Cantrell, Australian singer-songwriter and lawyer
  1943   – Alain Corneau, French director and screenwriter (d. 2010)
1944 – John Glover, American actor 
  1944   – Robert Mueller, American soldier and lawyer, 6th Director of the Federal Bureau of Investigation
1945 – Kenny Ireland, Scottish actor and director (d. 2014)
  1945   – Alan Page, American football player and jurist
1947 – Franciscus Henri, Dutch-Australian singer-songwriter
  1947   – Sofia Rotaru, Ukrainian singer-songwriter, producer, and actress
1948 – Marty Appel, American businessman and author
  1948   – Greg Chappell, Australian cricketer and coach
1949 – Walid Jumblatt, Lebanese journalist and politician
  1949   – Matthew Parris, South African-English journalist and politician
1950 – Rodney Crowell, American singer-songwriter and guitarist 
  1950   – Alan Keyes, American politician and diplomat, 16th Assistant Secretary of State for International Organization Affairs
  1950   – S. Thandayuthapani, Sri Lankan educator and politician
1952 – Caroline Aaron, American actress and producer
  1952   – Eamonn Darcy, Irish golfer
  1952   – Kees Kist, Dutch footballer
  1952   – Alexei Sayle, English comedian, actor, and author
1953 – Anne Fadiman, American journalist and author
1954 – Valery Gazzaev, Russian footballer, manager and politician
  1954   – Jonathan Pollard, Israeli spy
  1954   – Alan Reid, Scottish politician
1955 – Wayne Knight, American actor, comedian and voice actor
  1955   – Greg Nickels, American lawyer and politician, 51st Mayor of Seattle
  1955   – Vladimir Sorokin, Russian author and playwright
1957 – Daire Brehan, Irish journalist, lawyer, and actress (d. 2012)
  1957   – Alexander Dityatin, Russian gymnast and colonel
1958 – Russell Baze, Canadian-American jockey
  1958   – Bruce Dickinson, English singer-songwriter and guitarist
  1958   – Alberto Salazar, Cuban-American runner and coach
1959 – Koenraad Elst, Belgian orientalist and author
  1959   – Ali Shah, Zimbabwean cricketer and coach
1960 – David Duchovny, American actor, director, producer, and screenwriter
1961 – Brian Conley, English actor and singer
  1961   – Yelena Davydova, Russian gymnast
  1961   – Walter Swinburn, English jockey and trainer (d. 2016)
  1961   – Carlos Vives, Colombian singer, songwriter, and actor
1962 – Alison Brown, American banjo player, songwriter, and producer 
1963 – Paul Dunn, Australian rugby league player
  1963   – Nick Gillespie, American journalist and author
  1963   – Marcus Roberts, American pianist and educator
1964 – John Birmingham, English-Australian journalist and author
  1964   – Ian Dench, English guitarist and songwriter
  1964   – Peter Niven, Scottish jockey
1965 – Raul Malo, American singer-songwriter, guitarist, and producer 
  1965   – Elizabeth Manley, Canadian figure skater
1966 – David Cairns, Scottish laicised priest and politician, Minister of State for Scotland (d. 2011)
  1966   – Shobna Gulati, British actress
  1966   – Kristin Hersh, American singer-songwriter and guitarist 
  1966   – Jimmy Wales, American-British entrepreneur, co-founder of Wikipedia
1967 – Jason Grimsley, American baseball player
1968 – Francesca Gregorini, Italian-American director and screenwriter
  1968   – Trevor Hendy, Australian surfer and coach
  1968   – Sophie Lee, Australian actress and author
1969 – Paul Lambert, Scottish footballer and manager
  1969   – Dana G. Peleg, Israeli writer and LGBT activist
1970 – Eric Namesnik, American swimmer (d. 2006)
1971 – Dominic Cork, England cricketer and sportscaster
  1971   – Rachel York, American actress and singer
1972 – Gerry Peñalosa, Filipino boxer and promoter
1973 – Mikhail Gorsheniov, Russian singer-songwriter (d. 2013)
  1973   – Danny Graves, Vietnamese-American baseball player
  1973   – Kevin Muscat, English-Australian footballer, coach, and manager
1974 – Chico Benymon, American actor
  1974   – Michael Shannon, American actor
1975 – Koray Candemir, Turkish singer-songwriter
  1975   – Gerard Denton, Australian cricketer
  1975   – Megan Gale, Australian model and actress
  1975   – Ray Hill, American football player (d. 2015)
  1975   – Rebecca Kleefisch, American journalist and politician, 44th Lieutenant Governor of Wisconsin
  1975   – Édgar Rentería, Colombian baseball player
  1975   – Charlize Theron, South African actress
1976 – Dimitrios Eleftheropoulos, Greek footballer and manager
  1976   – Shane Lechler, American football player
1977 – Charlotte Ronson, English fashion designer
  1977   – Samantha Ronson, English singer-songwriter and DJ
  1977   – Justin Brooker, Rugby League Player
1978 – Alexandre Aja, French director, producer, and screenwriter
  1978   – Jamey Jasta, American singer-songwriter 
  1978   – Mark McCammon, English-Barbadian footballer
  1978   – Cirroc Lofton, American actor
1979 – Eric Johnson, American actor, director, and screenwriter
  1979   – Miguel Llera, Spanish footballer
  1979   – Birgit Zotz, Austrian anthropologist and author
1980 – Carsten Busch, German footballer
  1980   – Aurélie Claudel, French model and actress
  1980   – Tácio Caetano Cruz Queiroz, Brazilian footballer
  1980   – Seiichiro Maki, Japanese footballer
1981 – David Testo, American soccer player
  1981   – Randy Wayne, American actor and producer
1982 – Ángeles Balbiani, Argentine actress and singer
  1982   – Abbie Cornish, Australian actress
  1982   – Juan Martín Hernández, Argentine rugby player
  1982   – Marquise Hill, American football player (d. 2007)
  1982   – Vassilis Spanoulis, Greek basketball player
  1982   – Martin Vučić, Macedonian singer and drummer
1983 – Christian Chávez, Mexican singer-songwriter and actor 
  1983   – Murat Dalkılıç, Turkish singer-songwriter
  1983   – Danny, Portuguese footballer
  1983   – Andriy Hrivko, Ukrainian cyclist
  1983   – Mark Pettini, English cricketer and journalist
1984 – Stratos Perperoglou, Greek basketball player
  1984   – Tooba Siddiqui, Pakistani model and actress
  1984   – Yun Hyon-seok, South Korean poet and author (d. 2003) 
1986 – Paul Biedermann, German swimmer
  1986   – Valter Birsa, Slovenian footballer
  1986   – Altaír Jarabo, Mexican model and actress
  1986   – Juan de la Rosa, Mexican boxer
1987 – Sidney Crosby, Canadian ice hockey player
  1987   – Mustapha Dumbuya, Sierra Leonean footballer
  1987   – Ryan Lavarnway, American baseball player
  1987   – Rouven Sattelmaier, German footballer
1988 – Jonathan Bernier, Canadian ice hockey player
  1988   – Mohamed Coulibaly, Senegalese footballer
  1988   – Anisa Mohammed, West Indian cricketer
  1988   – Melody Oliveria, American blogger
  1988   – Erik Pieters, Dutch footballer
  1988   – Beanie Wells, American football player
1989 – DeMar DeRozan, American basketball player
1990 – Josh Franceschi, English singer-songwriter
1991 – Luis Salom, Spanish motorcycle racer (d. 2016)
  1991   – Mitchell te Vrede, Dutch footballer
  1991   – Mike Trout, American baseball player
1992 – Adam Yates, English cyclist
  1992   – Simon Yates, English cyclist
  1992   – E. J. Tackett, American bowler
1993 – Martti Nõmme, Estonian ski jumper
  1993   – Karol Zalewski, Polish sprinter
1997 – Matty Cash, Polish footballer
  1997   – Kyler Murray, American football player
1998 – Vladimir Barbu, Italian diver
  1998   – María Bazo, Peruvian windsurfer

Deaths

Pre-1600
 461 – Majorian, Roman emperor (b. 420)
707 – Li Chongjun, Chinese prince
1028 – Alfonso V, king of León (b. 994)
1106 – Henry IV, Holy Roman Emperor (b. 1050)
1234 – Hugh Foliot, bishop of Hereford (b. c. 1155)
1272 – Richard Middleton, English Lord Chancellor
1296 – Heinrich II von Rotteneck, prince-bishop of Regensburg
1385 – Joan of Kent, mother of Richard II (b. 1328)
1485 – Alexander Stewart, duke of Albany (b. 1454)
1547 – Cajetan, Italian priest and saint (b. 1480)

1601–1900
1613 – Thomas Fleming, English judge and politician, Lord Chief Justice of England (b. 1544)
1616 – Vincenzo Scamozzi, Italian architect, designed Teatro Olimpico (b. 1548)
1632 – Robert de Vere, 19th Earl of Oxford, English soldier (b. 1575)
1635 – Friedrich Spee, German poet and academic (b. 1591)
1639 – Martin van den Hove, Dutch astronomer and mathematician (b. 1605)
1661 – Jin Shengtan, Chinese journalist and critic (b. 1608)
1787 – Francis Blackburne, English Anglican churchman and activist (b. 1705)
1817 – Pierre Samuel du Pont de Nemours, French economist and politician (b. 1739)
1834 – Joseph Marie Jacquard, French weaver and inventor, invented the Jacquard loom (b. 1752)
1848 – Jöns Jacob Berzelius, Swedish chemist and academic (b. 1779)
1855 – Mariano Arista, Mexican general and politician, 19th President of Mexico (b. 1802)
1864 – Li Xiucheng, Chinese field marshal (b. 1823)
1893 – Alfredo Catalani, Italian composer and academic (b. 1854)
1899 – Jacob Maris, Dutch painter and educator (b. 1837)
1900 – Wilhelm Liebknecht, German lawyer and politician (b. 1826)

1901–present
1912 – François-Alphonse Forel, Swiss limnologist and academic (b. 1841)
1917 – Edwin Harris Dunning, South African-English commander and pilot (b. 1891)
1938 – Konstantin Stanislavski, Russian actor and director (b. 1863)
1941 – Rabindranath Tagore, Indian author, poet, and playwright, Nobel Prize laureate (b. 1861)
1948 – Charles Bryant, English-American actor and director (b. 1879)
1953 – Abner Powell, American baseball player and manager (b. 1860)
1957 – Oliver Hardy, American actor, singer, and director (b. 1892)
1958 – Elizabeth Foreman Lewis, American author and educator (b. 1892)
1960 – Luis Ángel Firpo, Argentine boxer (b. 1894)
1963 – Ramon Vila Capdevila, last of the Spanish Maquis, holding out after the end of the Spanish Civil War (b.1908)
1968 – Giovanni Bracco, Italian race car driver (b. 1908)
1969 – Jean Bastien, French professional footballer (b. 1915)
  1969   – Joseph Kosma, Hungarian-French composer (b. 1905)
1970 – Harold Haley, American lawyer and judge (b. 1904)
  1970   – Jonathan P. Jackson, American bodyguard and kidnapper (b. 1953)
1972 – Joi Lansing, American model, actress, and singer (b. 1929)
1973 – Jack Gregory, Australian cricketer (b. 1895)
1974 – Rosario Castellanos, Mexican poet and author (b. 1925)
  1974   – Sylvio Mantha, Canadian ice hockey player and coach (b. 1902)
1978 – Eddie Calvert, English trumpeter (b. 1922)    
1981 – Gunnar Uusi, Estonian chess player (b. 1931)
1985 – Grayson Hall, American actress (b. 1922)
1987 – Camille Chamoun, Lebanese lawyer and politician, 7th President of Lebanon (b. 1900)
1989 – Mickey Leland, American lawyer and politician (b. 1944)
1994 – Larry Martyn, English actor (b. 1934)
1995 – Brigid Brophy, English author and critic (b. 1929)
2001 – Algirdas Lauritėnas, Lithuanian basketball player (b. 1932)
2003 – K. D. Arulpragasam, Sri Lankan zoologist and academic (b. 1931)
  2003   – Mickey McDermott, American baseball player and coach (b. 1929)
2004 – Red Adair, American firefighter (b. 1915)
  2004   – Colin Bibby, English ornithologist and academic (b. 1948)
2005 – Peter Jennings, Canadian-American journalist and author (b. 1938)
2006 – Mary Anderson Bain, American lawyer and politician (b. 1911)
2007 – Ernesto Alonso, Mexican actor, director, and producer (b. 1917)
  2007   – Angus Tait, New Zealand businessman, founded Tait Communications (b. 1919)
2008 – Bernie Brillstein, American talent agent and producer (b. 1931)
  2008   – Andrea Pininfarina, Italian engineer and businessman (b. 1957)
2009 – Louis E. Saavedra, American educator and politician, 48th Mayor of Albuquerque (b. 1933)
  2009   – Mike Seeger, American singer-songwriter (b. 1933)
2010 – John Nelder, English mathematician and statistician (b. 1924)
2011 – Mark Hatfield, American soldier, academic, and politician, 29th Governor of Oregon (b. 1922)
  2011   – Nancy Wake, New Zealand-English captain and spy (b. 1912)
2012 – Murtuz Alasgarov, Azerbaijani academic and politician, Speaker of the National Assembly of Azerbaijan (b. 1928)
  2012   – Judith Crist, American critic and academic (b. 1922)
  2012   – Vladimir Kobzev, Russian footballer and coach (b. 1959)
  2012   – Anna Piaggi, Italian journalist and author (b. 1931)
  2012   – Mayer Zald, American sociologist and academic (b. 1931)
  2012   – Dušan Zbavitel, Czech indologist and author (b. 1925)
2013 – Samuel G. Armistead, American linguist, historian, and academic (b. 1927)
  2013   – Almir Kayumov, Russian footballer (b. 1964)
  2013   – Anthony Pawson, English-Canadian biologist, chemist, and academic (b. 1952)
  2013   – Margaret Pellegrini, American actress and dancer (b. 1923)
  2013   – Meeli Truu, Estonian architect (d. 1946)  
  2013   – Alexander Yagubkin, Russian boxer (b. 1961)
2014 – Víctor Fayad, Argentine lawyer and politician (b. 1955)
  2014   – Perry Moss, American football player and coach (b. 1926)
  2014   – Henry Stone, American record producer (b. 1921)
2015 – Manuel Contreras, Chilean general (b. 1929)
  2015   – Frances Oldham Kelsey, Canadian pharmacologist and physician (b. 1914)
  2015   – Louise Suggs, American golfer, co-founded LPGA (b. 1923)
2016 – Bryan Clauson, American racing driver (b. 1989)
2017 – Don Baylor, American baseball player (b. 1949)
  2017   – David Maslanka, American composer (b. 1943)
2018 – M. Karunanidhi, Indian politician, former Tamil Nadu Chief Minister and prominent leader of Tamils (b. 1924)
  2018   – Stan Mikita, Slovak hockey player (b. 1940)
2019 – David Berman, American musician, singer, poet and cartoonist (b. 1967)
2020 – Lê Khả Phiêu, Vietnamese politician (b. 1931)
2021 – Markie Post, American actress (b. 1950)
2022 - David McCullough, American historian and author (b. 1933)

Holidays and observances
 Assyrian Martyrs Day (Assyrian community)
 Battle of Boyacá Day (Colombia)
 Christian feast day:
 Albert of Trapani
 Cajetan of Thienna
 Carpophorus and companions
 Dometius of Persia
 Donatus of Arezzo
 Donatus of Besançon
 Donatus of Muenstereifel
 John Mason Neale and Catherine Winkworth (Episcopal Church (USA))
 Nantovinus
 Pope Sixtus II
 August 7 (Eastern Orthodox liturgics)
 Filseta (Ethiopian and Eritrean Orthodox Tewahedo Church)
 Emancipation Day (Saint Kitts and Nevis)
 Republic Day (Ivory Coast)
 Youth Day (Kiribati)
 National Purple Heart Day (United States)

References

External links

 
 
 

Days of the year
August